Hahncappsia is a genus of moths of the family Crambidae, and the order Lepidoptera.

Species
Hahncappsia alpinensis (Capps, 1967)
Hahncappsia autocratoralis 
Hahncappsia cayugalis 
Hahncappsia chiapasalis 
Hahncappsia cochisensis (Capps, 1967)
Hahncappsia coloradensis (Grote & Robinson, 1867)
Hahncappsia conisphora (Hampson, 1913)
Hahncappsia conisphoralis 
Hahncappsia corozalis 
Hahncappsia cynoalis (Druce, 1895)
Hahncappsia ecuadoralis 
Hahncappsia entephrialis 
Hahncappsia fordi (Capps, 1967)
Hahncappsia huachucalis (Capps, 1967)
Hahncappsia jacalensis 
Hahncappsia jaliscalis 
Hahncappsia jaralis (Schaus, 1920)
Hahncappsia lautalis 
Hahncappsia mancalis (Lederer, 1863)
Hahncappsia mancaloides 
Hahncappsia marculenta (Grote & Robinson, 1867)
Hahncappsia marialis 
Hahncappsia mellinialis (Druce, 1899)
Hahncappsia neobliteralis (Capps, 1967)
Hahncappsia neomarculenta (Capps, 1967)
Hahncappsia neotropicalis 
Hahncappsia nigripes (Schaus, 1920)
Hahncappsia pergilvalis (Hulst, 1886)
Hahncappsia potosiensis 
Hahncappsia praxitalis (Druce, 1895)
Hahncappsia pseudobliteralis (Capps, 1967)
Hahncappsia purulhalis 
Hahncappsia ramsdenalis (Schaus, 1920)
Hahncappsia sacculalis 
Hahncappsia spinalis 
Hahncappsia straminea 
Hahncappsia suarezalis 
Hahncappsia volcanensis 
Hahncappsia yucatanalis

References

Pyraustinae
Crambidae genera
Taxa named by Eugene G. Munroe